Philip Henry Loyd (8 July 1884 -  11 January 1952) was an eminent Anglican Bishop  and author, in the second quarter of the 20th century. He was educated at Eton and King's College, Cambridge and ordained in 1911. His first post was as a Curate at St Mary of Eton, Hackney Wick after which he was Vice-Principal of Ripon College Cuddesdon. From 1915 to 1944 he served the church in India rising in time to be Bishop of Nasik. In that year he was translated to St Albans where he served the Episcopate for a further six years.

Notes

1884 births
1952 deaths
People educated at Eton College
Alumni of King's College, Cambridge
20th-century English Anglican priests
Bishops of St Albans
Anglican bishops of Nasik
Anglican writers
British expatriates in India